Mantonella is a genus in the phylum Apicomplexa.

This genus has been poorly studied and little is known about it.

The type species is Mantonella peripati

History

This genus was created by Vincent in 1936. It was also recognised by Gousseff also in 1936 who proposed the name  (synonym Yakimovella. The genus name Mantonella have been given precedence.

Description

The oocysts each have one sporocyst. Each sporocyst has four sporozoites.

Notes

Species from this genus have been described from vertebrates and invertebrates. It seems likely that at least some of the species described are not true species but rather pseudoparasites.

References

Apicomplexa genera